Shady Grove is an unincorporated community within Crittenden County, Kentucky, United States.

History
A post office was established at Shady Grove in 1852, and remained in operation until it was discontinued in 1950. In 1877, Shady Grove reportedly contained 2 churches, 3 stores, and 2 hotels.

References

Unincorporated communities in Crittenden County, Kentucky
Unincorporated communities in Kentucky